Pakistan International Airlines Flight 268 was an Airbus A300, registration  which crashed while approaching Kathmandu's Tribhuvan International Airport on 28 September 1992. All 167 people on board were killed. Flight 268 is the worst crash of Pakistan International Airlines, and the worst ever to occur in Nepal.

Aircraft and crew 

The aircraft involved was a 16-year-old Airbus A300B4-203 registered as AP-BCP (serial number 025). The aircraft was built in 1976 and flew its maiden flight on 23 March the same year. On 2 May 1977, the aircraft was delivered to Bavaria Germanair, and was registered as D-AMAZ. About a week later, it was leased to EgyptAir. The aircraft was re-registered as SU-AZY and subsequently sold to Hapag-Lloyd Flug after its merger with Bavaria Germanair. The aircraft was then re-registered as D-AHLZ and leased to the following airlines:

 EgyptAir (January 1979October 1982)
 Kuwait Airways (AprilJuly 1983)
 Capitol Air (JuneOctober 1984)
 Air Jamaica (FebruaryApril 1985)
 Condor Flugdienst (MayNovember 1985)

On 21 April 1986, the aircraft was delivered to Pakistan International Airlines, and was re-registered as AP-BCP. The aircraft had a total of 39,045 flying hours and 19,172 landings at the time of the crash.

The captain was 49-year-old Iftikhar Janjua, who had 13,192 flight hours, including 6,260 hours on the Airbus A300. The first officer was 38-year-old Hassan Akhtar, who had 5,849 flight hours, with 1,469 of them on the Airbus A300. 

There were two flight engineers on board: one operating and the other observing. The operating flight engineer was an unnamed 40-year-old male who had 5,289 flight hours, with 2,516 of them on the Airbus A300. The observing flight engineer, 42-year-old Muhammad Ashraf, had 8,220 flight hours, including 4,503 hours on the Airbus A300.

Accident
Flight 268 departed Karachi at 11:13 AM Pakistan Standard Time for Kathmandu.  Upon contacting Nepalese air traffic control, the aircraft was cleared for an approach from the south called the Sierra approach. An aircraft cleared to use this approach was at the time directed to pass over a reporting point called "Romeo" located 41 miles (66 km) south of the Kathmandu VOR (or at 41 DME) at an altitude of 15,000 feet. The aircraft was to then descend in seven steps to 5,800 feet, passing over a reporting point known as "Sierra" located at 10 DME at an altitude of 9,500 feet, before landing at Kathmandu. This approach allowed aircraft to pass over the Mahabharat Range directly south of Kathmandu (the crest of which is located just north of the Sierra reporting point) at a safe altitude.

Shortly after reporting at 10 DME, at 2.30 pm the aircraft crashed at approximately  into the side of the 8,250 ft (2,524 m) mountain at Bhattedanda, disintegrating on impact, instantly killing all aboard; the tail fin separated and fell into the forest at the base of the mountainside.

This accident occurred 59 days after Thai Airways International Flight 311 crashed north of Kathmandu.

Victims
Most of the victims were a mix of European, Nepalese and other nationalities.

Investigation and causes
After the crash, the Nepali Military assisted with investigators to find the aircraft's black box. The investigation was handled by Andrew Robinson from the Air Accident Investigation Branch (AAIB). The black box was initially sent to Paris for decoding.

At the time of impact, eye witnesses near the accident site confirmed that there was little to no wind, rain, and no thunderstorms in the area. Investigators found no technical problems documented for the A300 and, after considering it as a cause, subsequently ruled out terrorism.

Although no pertinent flight deck conversation was recovered from Flight 268's cockpit voice recorder by investigators with the Transportation Safety Board of Canada (TSB), which assisted with the investigation, data recovered from the flight data recorder by the TSB showed that the aircraft initiated each step of its descent one step too early. At 16 DME the aircraft was a full 1,000 feet below its cleared altitude; at 10 DME (the Sierra reporting point) it was 1,300 feet below its cleared altitude.  The aircraft approached the Mahabharat Range at an insufficient altitude and crashed into the south slope. Although the pilots of Flight 268 reported their aircraft's altitude accurately to air traffic control, controllers did nothing to warn them of their inappropriate altitude until seconds before the accident.

Investigators determined that the accident had been caused mainly by pilot error. Visibility was poor due to overcast and the ground proximity warning system would not have been triggered in time because of the steep terrain. The approach plates for Kathmandu issued to PIA pilots were also determined to be unclear, and Nepalese air traffic controllers were judged timid and reluctant to intervene in what they saw as piloting matters such as terrain separation. The report recommended that ICAO review navigational charts and encourage their standardisation, and that the approach to Kathmandu Airport be changed to be less complex.

Memorials
PIA paid for and maintains the Lele PIA Memorial Park at Lele, at the foot of a mountain about 10km north of the crash site.

The Wilkins Memorial Trust, a UK charitable organisation that provides aid to Nepal, was established in memory of a family killed in the crash.

Dramatization 
The accident is featured in the first episode of Season 20 of Mayday, also known as Air Crash Investigation. The episode is titled "Kathmandu Descent".

See also
 List of accidents and incidents involving commercial aircraft
 Thai Airways International Flight 311
 List of airplane accidents in Nepal

References

Further reading 

 

Aviation accidents and incidents in Nepal
Aviation accidents and incidents in 1992
Airliner accidents and incidents involving controlled flight into terrain
Airliner accidents and incidents caused by pilot error
Accidents and incidents involving the Airbus A300
268
1992 in Nepal
History of Nepal (1951–2008)
September 1992 events in Asia
1992 disasters in Nepal